Puerto Leguízamo is a town and municipality located in the Putumayo Department, a southern border region of the Republic of Colombia. It is on the north bank of the Putumayo River.

Its Catedral Nuestra Señora del Carmen, dedicated to Our Lady of Mount Carmel, is the cathedral episcopal see of the Latin Catholic missionary pre-diocesan Apostolic Vicariate of Puerto Leguízamo-Solano.

Puerto Leguízamo is served by Caucayá Airport.

Climate
Puerto Leguízamo has a tropical rainforest climate (Af) with heavy to very heavy rainfall year-round.

References

External links 
 Informacion Ambiental de la Amazonia colombiana

Municipalities of Putumayo Department